Robert Ionel Niţă (born 2 April 1977 in Bucharest) is a retired Romanian football player.

Career
Robert Niţă was born in Bucharest, and his first club was Steaua București in Romania. He later joined Corvinul Hunedoara, Cimentul Fieni and Oțelul Galați where he was one of the best players in the team. In 1999, he returned to Steaua for a short period. Next signed with Foresta Suceava and scored 9 goals in 15 matches. In 2000, he came to Rapid București, season 2000–01 he finished 3rd place in the top scores classification with 14 goals (9 scored for Foresta Suceava) in Liga I. In 2004, he was bought by Israelian team Hapoel Be'er Sheva. Is next signed with Gloria Bistriţa and Pandurii Târgu-Jiu. In 2008, he joined Viettel from Vietnam and retired there.

International career
Robert Niţă has played 30 times for the Romania U-17 and he scored 12 goals.
He played also for Romania U-21 9 games and he scored 2 goals.

Honours

Club
Rapid București
Romanian Championship League: 2002–03
Cupa României: 2001–02
Supercupa României: 2002, 2003

External links
 
 
 

1977 births
Living people
Footballers from Bucharest
Romanian footballers
FC Steaua București players
CS Corvinul Hunedoara players
FC Rapid București players
ASC Oțelul Galați players
CS Pandurii Târgu Jiu players
AFC Rocar București players
Hapoel Be'er Sheva F.C. players
Expatriate footballers in Israel
Expatriate footballers in Vietnam
Liga I players
V.League 1 players
Israeli Premier League players
Association football forwards